Rebecca Shaw may refer to:

 Rebecca Shaw (author), writer
 Rebecca Shaw (General Hospital), fictional character
 Rebecca Shaw, first officer of Colgan Air Flight 3407
 Becky Shaw, 2008 play by Gina Gionfriddo